Alanko is a Finnish surname. Notable people with the surname include:

 Ismo Alanko (born 1960), Finnish rock singer/songwriter
 Outi Alanko-Kahiluoto (born 1966), Finnish MP, representing the Green League
 Kari Alanko, Finnish ambassador to Vietnam
 Ilkka Alanko, Finnish singer

Finnish-language surnames